The Tokyo Building is an office building located in Tokyo, Japan.

The Tokyo Building is primarily used for offices and serves as the headquarters of the following companies:
 Mitsubishi Electric 
 JPMorgan Chase
 Mitsubishi Shoji UBS Reality
 Azbil
 Tanaka Kikinzoku Group
It also contains the Tokia retail and dining centre and the Cotton Club nightclub on its lower floors.

Photos

See also 

List of tallest buildings and structures in Tokyo

References

External links

 JR East Building Co., Ltd.
 Mitsubishi Estate
 Tokyo Information Net

Buildings and structures completed in 2005
Skyscraper office buildings in Tokyo
Marunouchi
Mitsubishi Electric
Buildings and structures in Chiyoda, Tokyo
Mitsubishi Estate
Retail buildings in Tokyo